Alessio Besio (born 18 March 2004) is a Swiss professional footballer who plays as a forward for Swiss club St. Gallen. He was included in The Guardian's "Next Generation" list for 2021.

Personal life
Besio is the son of former professional footballer Claudio Besio.

Career statistics

Club

Notes

References

2004 births
Living people
Swiss men's footballers
Swiss people of Spanish descent
Association football forwards
Swiss Super League players
FC St. Gallen players
Sportspeople from St. Gallen (city)